The Communauté de communes du Montois is a former federation of municipalities (communauté de communes) in the Seine-et-Marne département and in the Île-de-France région of France. It was created in December 1998. It was merged into the new Communauté de communes de la Bassée - Montois in January 2014.

Composition 
The Communauté de communes comprised the following communes:

Cessoy-en-Montois
Châtenay-sur-Seine
Coutençon
Donnemarie-Dontilly
Égligny
Gurcy-le-Châtel
Jutigny
Lizines
Luisetaines
Meigneux
Mons-en-Montois
Montigny-Lencoup
Paroy
Savins
Sigy
Sognolles-en-Montois
Thénisy
Villeneuve-les-Bordes
Vimpelles

See also
Communes of the Seine-et-Marne department

References

Former commune communities of Seine-et-Marne